Canada competed at the 1948 Summer Olympics in London, England. 118 competitors, 100 men and 18 women, took part in 80 events in 13 sports.

Medalists

Silver
 Douglas Bennett – Canoeing, men's C-1 1000 metres

Bronze
 Norman Lane – Canoeing, men's C-1 10000 metres
 Viola Myers, Nancy MacKay, Diane Foster, Patricia Jones – Athletics, women's 4×100 metre relay

Athletics

Men's 100 metres
Edward Haggis
James O'Brien

Men's 200 metres
Edward Haggis
Donald Pettie

Men's 400 metres
Ernest McCullough
Bob McFarlane
Don McFarlane

Men's 800 metres
Ezra Henniger
Jack Hutchins
William Parnell

Men's 1500 metres
Jack Hutchins
William Parnell
Clifford Salmond

Men's 5000 metres
Clifford Salmond

Men's 4 × 100 m relay
 Edward Haggis, Don McFarlane, James O'Brien, and Donald Pettie

Men's 4 × 400 m relay
 William Larochelle, Ernest McCullough, Bob McFarlane, and Don McFarlane

Men's marathon
Gérard Côté
Lloyd Evans
Walter Fedorick

Men's 400m hurdles
William Larochelle

Men's shot put
Eric Coy

Men's discus throw
Eric Coy

Men's high jump
Arthur Jackes

Men's javelin throw
Leo Roininen

Men's Decathlon
Lionel Fournier

Women's 100 metres
Millicent Cousins
Patricia Jones
Viola Myers

Women's 200 metres
Millicent Cousins
Diane Foster
Donna Gilmore

Women's high jump
Shirley Olafsson
Elaine Silburn
Doreen Wolff

Women's long jump
Elaine Silburn

Women's 4 × 100 m relay
 Viola Myers, Nancy MacKay, Diane Foster, and Patricia Jones

Basketball

Men's team competition
Preliminary round (group A)
 Defeated Italy (55-37)
 Defeated Great Britain (44-24)
 Lost to Hungary (36-37)
 Lost to Brazil (35-57)
 Defeated Uruguay (52-50)
Classification matches
 9th/16th place: defeated Iran (81-25)
 9th/12th place: defeated Belgium (45-40)
 9th/10th place: defeated Peru (49-43) → Ninth place
Team roster
 Ole Bakken
 William Bell
 David Bloomfield
 David Campbell
 Harry Kermode
 Bennie Lands
 Patrick McGeer
 James Reid Mitchell
 Mendy Morein
 Gary Neville Munro
 Robert Scarr
 Sidney Strulovitch
 Sol Tolchinsky
 Murray Waxman

Boxing

Men's flyweight (– 51 kg)
Joey Sandulo

Men's bantamweight (– 54 kg)
Frederick Daigle

Men's featherweight (– 57 kg)
Armand Savoie

Men's lightweight (– 60 kg)
Edward Haddad

Men's welterweight (– 69 kg)
Clifford Blackburn

Men's middleweight (– 75 kg)
John Keenan

Men's Heavyweight (– 91 kg)
Adam Faul

Canoeing

Cycling

Six cyclists, all men, represented Canada in 1948.

Individual road race
 Lorne Atkinson
 Florent Jodoin
 Lance Pugh
 Laurent Tessier

Team road race
 Lorne Atkinson
 Florent Jodoin
 Lance Pugh
 Laurent Tessier

Sprint
 Bob Lacourse

Time trial
 Lorne Atkinson

Team pursuit
 Lorne Atkinson
 William Hamilton
 Lance Pugh
 Laurent Tessier

Diving

Men's 3m springboard
George Athans Sr.

Men's 10m platform
George Athans Sr.

Fencing

Six fencers, four men and two women, represented Canada in 1948.

Men's foil
 Alf Horn
 Georges Pouliot
 Roland Asselin

Men's team foil
 Robert Desjarlais, Georges Pouliot, Alf Horn, Roland Asselin

Men's épée
 Alf Horn
 Roland Asselin
 Georges Pouliot

Men's team épée
 Robert Desjarlais, Alf Horn, Roland Asselin, Georges Pouliot

Men's sabre
 Roland Asselin

Men's team sabre
 Robert Desjarlais, Alf Horn, Roland Asselin, Georges Pouliot

Women's foil
 Rhoda Martin
 Betty Hamilton

Rowing

Canada had eleven male rowers participate in two out of seven rowing events in 1948.

 Men's double sculls
 Gabriel Beaudry
 Fred Graves

 Men's eight
 Peter Green
 Robert Christmas
 Art Griffiths
 Alfred Stefani
 Marvin Hammond
 Jack Zwirewich
 Bill McConnell
 Ron Cameron
 Walt Robertson (cox)

Sailing

Men's Finn
Paul McLaughlin

Men's Star
 Gerald Fairhead and Norman Gooderham

Men's Swallow
John Robertson and Richard Townsend

Swimming

Weightlifting

Wrestling

Art competitions

References

External links

sports-reference

Nations at the 1948 Summer Olympics
1948
Summer Olympics